Callinectes bocourti is a species of swimming crab. Its native range extends from Jamaica and Belize south to Brazil, but it has been found as a nonindigenous species as far north as North Carolina. This crab has a light brown shell with red spots and markings on it, and red claws and legs. C. bocourti is edible and has been the subject of small-scale fishery.

References

Portunoidea
Crustaceans of the Atlantic Ocean
Arthropods of the Dominican Republic
Crustaceans described in 1879